Long Beard is the stage name of New Brunswick, New Jersey musician Leslie Bear, born 23 October 1990.

History
Bear released her first EP, Holy Crow, in 2014. Bear released her first album in 2015 on Team Love Records titled Sleepwalker.

On September 13, 2019, Bear released her second full-length album and first on Double Double Whammy titled Means to Me.

Influences
Bear listened to Faye Wong growing up.

Discography
Studio albums
Sleepwalker (2015, Team Love Records)
Means to Me (2019, Double Double Whammy)
EPs
Holy Crow (2014, self-released)

References

Musicians from New Brunswick, New Jersey
American indie rock musicians
Living people
Team Love Records artists
1990 births